Can mean one of the following German morning newspapers:

Berliner Morgenzeitung published in Berlin, Germany
Braunschweiger Morgenzeitung published in Braunschweig, Germany
Wiener Morgenzeitung published in Vienna, Austria
Ostrauer Morgenzeitung in Ostrava, Czech Republic